The 25th CARIFTA Games was held in Kingston, Jamaica, on April 6–8, 1996.  An appraisal of the results has been given on the occasion of 40th anniversary of the games.

Participation (unofficial)

Detailed result lists can be found on the "World Junior Athletics History" website.  An unofficial count yields the number of about 272 athletes (152 junior (under-20) and 120 youth (under-17)) from about 23 countries:  Antigua and Barbuda (8), Aruba (4), Bahamas (23), Barbados (28), Belize (2), Bermuda (12), British Virgin Islands (3), Cayman Islands (13), Dominica (2), French Guiana (1), Grenada (9), Guadeloupe (20), Guyana (2), Jamaica (56), Martinique (15), Montserrat (4), Netherlands Antilles (4), Saint Kitts and Nevis (5), Saint Lucia (1), Saint Vincent and the Grenadines (1), Trinidad and Tobago (30), Turks and Caicos Islands (11), US Virgin Islands (18).

Austin Sealy Award

The Austin Sealy Trophy for the most outstanding athlete of the games was awarded to Cydonie Mothersill from the Cayman Islands.  She won 2 gold medals (100m, and 200m) in the junior (U-20) category.

Medal summary
Medal winners are published by category: Boys under 20 (Junior), Girls under 20 (Junior), Boys under 17 (Youth), and Girls under 17 (Youth).
Complete results can be found on the "World Junior Athletics History" website.

Boys under 20 (Junior)

Girls under 20 (Junior)

Boys under 17 (Youth)

Girls under 17 (Youth)

Medal table (unofficial)

References

External links
World Junior Athletics History

CARIFTA Games
1996 in Jamaican sport
CARIFTA
1996 in Caribbean sport
International athletics competitions hosted by Jamaica